Srinagar Hydro electric Power Project in, Srinagar, in Pauri Garhwal district, Uttarakhand, is a hydroelectric power plant built on Alaknanda River. The power plant is owned by Alaknanda Hydro Power Corporation Limited a GVK Group company. Bharat Heavy Electricals supplied the major equipments.

Power generation capacity
Its installed capacity is of 330 MW (4x82.5 MW).

References

Hydroelectric power stations in Uttarakhand
Pauri Garhwal district
2015 establishments in Uttarakhand
Energy infrastructure completed in 2015